Nicolle Anne Galyon (born July 22, 1984) is a singer, songwriter, producer, record label executive, & publishing executive from Sterling, Kansas. She has written songs for Lady A, Miranda Lambert, Keith Urban, Kenny Chesney, Dan + Shay, Florida Georgia Line, and many others. Galyon has written nine No. 1 hits including "Automatic", Miranda Lambert's chart-topping lead single from her critically album Platinum, which debuted at No. 1 on the Billboard Hot 200 chart and featured five songs by Galyon.

Early life 
Nicolle was born to Chris and LaMonna (née Hahn) Galyon of Sterling, Kansas. She has three younger brothers: Riley, Taylor, and Cooper.

Career
Originally from Sterling, Kansas, Galyon made her way to Nashville, Tennessee in 2002 to attend Belmont University for Music Business. At Belmont, Galyon discovered her passion for songwriting  and signed a publishing deal with Warner/Chappell Nashville shortly after graduating in 2006. In 2012, Nicolle appeared on The Voice as a contestant on Adam Levine's team. There she met RaeLynn and Miranda Lambert, two friendships that she accredits to kickstarting her songwriting career. Galyon earned her first #1 song with We Were Us performed by Keith Urban and Miranda Lambert. With cowriters Miranda Lambert and Natalie Hemby, Galyon won 2015 ACM's 'Song of the Year', and the 2014 CMA's single of the year for the Miranda Lambert performed hit song Automatic. Since then Galyon has had songs recorded by RaeLynn on her album WildHorse, Dan + Shay on their album Obsessed, Kenny Chesney on his album Cosmic Hallelujah, Florida Georgia Line on their album Dig Your Roots, Lady Antebellum on their album Golden, and Thomas Rhett on his album Tangled Up, among others. Galyon partnered with Big Loud to launch the female-focused record label, Songs & Daughters. The label was announced in July 2019 and signed Madison Kozak as its flagship artist. In 2020, Galyon expanded Songs & Daughters to include a publishing arm. In 2020, Galyon served as a producer and writer on iHeartRadio scripted podcast "Make It Up As We Go."  Nicolle Galyon currently resides in Nashville.

Philanthropy 
Galyon is heavily involved in the CMA Foundation's music education initiative and served as an NSAI Board Member & CMT Next Women of Country mentor. Galyon has worked with Save the Music + SongFarm to put music studios in high schools throughout the country. She also provides a college scholarship to a senior at her alma mater, Sterling High School, each year through the Autobiography Scholarship.

Personal life 
Galyon married songwriter Rodney Clawson October 13, 2007. They have two children together, daughter Charlie Jo Clawson born May 29, 2013, and son Ford Sterling Clawson born April 14, 2015.

Discography

Studio albums
 firstborn (2022)

Songwriting

Awards and nominations

References

People from Sterling, Kansas
Belmont University alumni
Songwriters from Tennessee
People from Nashville, Tennessee
Songwriters from Kansas
The Voice (franchise) contestants